The 1995 Samoa rugby union tour of Great Britain was a series of matches played in October and November 1995 in Scotland and England by the Samoa national rugby union team. The tour was made after the good results at the 1995 Rugby World Cup.

Results 
Scores and results list Samoa's points tally first.

References

 
1995 rugby union tours
1995
1995 in Oceanian rugby union
1995–96 in British rugby union
1995–96 in English rugby union
1995–96 in Scottish rugby union
1995
1995
1995